Zoar is a primarily instrumental musical group from New York City. Michael Montes, a former medical student, formed Zoar in 1995 with Peter Rundquist, who formerly worked on Wall Street, and Erik Friedlander. Zoar's music is sometimes categorized as rock, but the band categorize themselves as Gothic, Ambient, Classical, and Experimental.

Members
 Michael Montes (keyboard, primary composer)
 Peter Rundquist (guitar, co-composer)
 Erik Friedlander (cellist)

Guest musicians 
Clouds Without Water
 Brendan Perry (of Dead Can Dance)
 Matt Johnson (of The The)
 Jennifer Charles (of Elysian Fields)
 Julie Comparini (vocalist who specializes in baroque and renaissance music)
 Tony Levin

Discography 
 Cassandra (1997)
 In the Bloodlit Dark (2001)
 Clouds Without Water (2003)

References

External links
 Official web site

 
 
 

American instrumental musical groups
Musical groups established in 1995